"Luv U Better" is a song by LL Cool J, released as the lead single from his ninth studio album, 10 (2002). Released on August 13, 2002, by Def Jam Recordings, it was produced by The Neptunes and features additional vocals from Marc Dorsey. "Luv U Better" was a huge success in the United States, reaching the top five of three major Billboard charts: it peaked at number four on the Billboard Hot 100, number two on the Hot Rap Tracks, and number one the Hot R&B/Hip-Hop Songs.

Music video
The video (directed by Benny Boom) was shot on Veteran Avenue in Los Angeles. The video was inspired by the 1990 American romantic comedy film Pretty Woman. The leading lady in the video was Playboy playmate and American model Nicole Narain.

Track listing
U.S. 12" single
Side A:
"Luv U Better" (Radio Edit) – 4:47
"Luv U Better" (LP Version) – 4:47
"Luv U Better" (Instrumental) – 4:47
Side B:
"Fa Ha" (Radio Edit) – 4:55
"Fa Ha" (LP Version) – 4:55
"Fa Ha"(Instrumental) – 4:55

Charts

Weekly charts

Year-end charts

References

2002 singles
LL Cool J songs
Music videos directed by Benny Boom
Song recordings produced by the Neptunes
Songs written by Pharrell Williams
Songs written by Chad Hugo
Songs written by LL Cool J